Freeze-Frame is the tenth studio album by American rock band the J. Geils Band, and the last one to feature original vocalist Peter Wolf. The album was released on October 26, 1981, by EMI Records. It reached number one on the United States Billboard 200 album chart in February 1982, and remained at the top for four weeks. The album featured the hit singles "Centerfold" (No. 1 US; No. 3 UK) and "Freeze Frame" (No. 4 US). "Angel in Blue" also reached the US Top 40.

Keyboardist Seth Justman wrote or co-wrote all of the album as well as receiving credit as arranger and producer of the material.

A 2013 Spin article called "Flamethrower" the band's funkiest song and said: "With three avant-gardish anomalies that flirted with harmolodic punk-jazz funk ("Rage in the Cage," "Insane, Insane Again," and "River Blindness") balancing out three slick Top 10 pop hits, 1981's Freeze Frame holds the rare if not impossible distinction of being simultaneously both the J. Geils Band's most blatantly pop and mostly blatantly experimental album."

Track listing
All songs written by Seth Justman except where noted.

Personnel

The J. Geils Band
Peter Wolf – lead vocals
Seth Justman – keyboards, backing vocals
J. Geils – guitar
Danny Klein – bass
Magic Dick – harmonica, trumpet, saxophone
Stephen Jo Bladd – drums

Additional musicians
Randy Brecker, Tom "Bones" Malone, Lou Marini, George Young, Ronnie Cuber, Alan Rubin – horns
Tawatha Agee, Cissy Houston, Fonzi Thornton, Luther Vandross, Ken Williams – backing vocals
Cengiz Yaltkaya – conductor

Production
Seth Justman – producer, arrangements
David Thoener – engineer, mixing at Record Plant, New York
Jesse Henderson, Steve Marcantonio – assistant engineers
Joe Brescio – mastering

Charts

Weekly charts

Year-end charts

Singles

Certifications

References

1981 albums
The J. Geils Band albums
EMI Records albums
Albums recorded at Long View Farm
Albums produced by Seth Justman